The Ajam of Bahrain, also known as Persians of Bahrain or Iranians of Bahrain, are an ethnic group in Bahrain composed of Shia Bahraini citizens of Persian/Iranian background.

The Ajam are estimated to number around 100,000, 14% of Bahraini citizen population, who mostly Shi’ite, although there are a small number of native Sunni families. They are mostly bilingual in Persian and Arabic. The Ajam aren’t the majority in any city or village in Bahrain, yet have significant numbers in Shi’ite majority areas such as Saar, Diraz and Samaheej. It is worth noting that both Samaheej and Diraz have their names derived from Farsi.

History
Persian migration into Bahrain  goes back to the days of the Sassanid and Achaemenid Persian empire, though in modern times there has been a constant migration for hundreds of years. There has always been a migration of Persian-speaking Shi'a into Bahrain.
 
In 1910, the Persian community funded and opened a private school, Al-Ittihad school, that taught Persian, besides other subjects. In the Manama Souq, many Persians were clustered in the neighborhood of Mushbir. However they resettled in other areas with the development of new towns and expansion of villages during the reign of Isa bin Salman Al Khalifa. Today, a significant number is based in Muharraq's Shia enclaves and Bahrain Island's modernized Shia towns.

Matam Al-Ajam Al-Kabeer

Matam Al-Ajam Al-Kabeer (Arabic:مأتم العجم الكبير) is the first Persian Matam and the largest such matam in Bahrain. It was founded in Fareej el-Makharqa by  Abdul-Nabi Al-Kazerooni, a rich Persian merchant who was a representative of the Persian community in the council of the hakim Isa ibn Ali Al Khalifa. Himself an immigrant from the Dashti region of Iran, he single-handedly organised processions, collected donations and hired orators to speak at the matam. Construction started in 1882 as a specialized building where Ashura, a holy day in Shia Islam, would be marked with processions, ceremonial flagellation and passion plays commemorating the death of Imam Hussain. The matam is still used for this purpose.

It was originally built with simple construction material such as palm tree trunks and leaf stalks. The matam was formally established in 1904 where it was decided that the matam would be renovated with rocks, clay and cement. Initially in the 1890s, the matam was primarily supported by Persian merchants, with two-thirds of the donation coming from the Bushehri and Safar family, respectively. For much of the 20th century, the matam had relied on yearly donations of money and land from rich and poor members of the Persian community and from waqf revenue. The matam also had an emergency relief fund that was to be distributed to the poor and to needy individuals; the matam provided financial aid and shelter to people following the collapse of the pearling market in the 1930s.

Upon the death of Abdul-Nabi Al-Kazerooni in 1927, Abdul Nabi Bushehri, himself a Persian immigrant from Bushehr and a well-respected figure in the Persian community, took control of the matam. Unlike his close friend, Bushehri ran the matam with other notables of the Persian community, forming a de facto board. Upon Bushehri's death in 1945, the board took over. In order to prevent confusion, the board appointed a specific member, Hasan Baljik, to act as key carrier to the matam and responsible for programs and budgetary issues. In 1971, an administrative board consisting of a president, vice president, secretary, treasurer and others was set up, all of whom were rich merchants.

Culture

Language
The Ajam speak southern Persian dialects distinctive to the cities they have originated from, for example:

 "Why" in official Persian dialect is "baráye che" while in southern Persian dialect is "seche".
 "Money" in official Persian dialect is "Púl" while in southern Persian dialect is "payse".
 "Do you want water?" in official Persian dialect is "áb mikháhi" while in southern Persian dialect is "ow mikhay".
 
In addition to this, many names of villages in Bahrain are derived from Persian, which are thought to have been as a result of influences during the Safavid rule of Bahrain (1501–1722) and the previous Persian rule. City and village names such as Manama, Karbabad, Salmabad, Karzakan, Samaheej, Tashan, Duraz, Barbar, Demistan, Karrana, Shakhura, Shahrekan, and Jurdab were originally derived from Persian, suggesting Persian influence on the island's history.

The Persian language has had the biggest foreign linguistic influence on Bahraini Arabic. The indigenous Bahrani dialect of Bahrain has also borrowed many words from Persian, for example:
Chandal - woods used in constructing the roof of old buildings.
Baadgeer - towers with single or two, three or four sided openings above dwellings in order to let wind air into the building to create a current and hence cool the air inside the lower floor rooms.
Surwaal - trousers.
Jurab - socks.
Sirdaab - cellar.
Tannuur - coal oven.

Food
One of the notable local delicacies of the Persians in Bahrain is mahyawa, consumed in Southern Iran as well, is a watery earth brick coloured sauce made from sardines and consumed with bread or other food. Persians are known and are famous in Bahrain for bread-making. Another local delicacy is "pishoo" made from rose water (golab) and agar agar. Cham-Chamoo is a sweet naan that is made similar to Qeshm Island version. Other food items consumed are similar to Persian cuisine.

Notable people
 Abdulhussain bin Ali Mirza, the current Minister of Electricity and Water Affairs of Bahrain.
 Fatema Hameed Gerashi, a Bahraini swimmer.
 Karim Fakhrawi, the co-founder of Al-Wasat, considered one of the more popular newspapers in Bahrain by winning numerous awards.
 Ghada Jamshir (Arabic:غادة جمشير), a women's rights activist.
 Zainab Al Askari (Arabic:زينب غلوم العسكري), an author and actress.
 Sultaneez Band.

See also
 History of Bahrain
 'Ajam of Kuwait
 Iranians in Iraq
 Ajam
 Baharna
 Iranian diaspora

Further reading

References

External links
 Matam Al Ajam Al Kabeer, officially recognised in 1881
 Matam Al Ajam Al Kabeer

Ethnic groups in Bahrain
Bahraini people of Iranian descent
Iranian diaspora in the Middle East